Nolan Mbemba (born 19 February 1995) is a professional footballer who plays as a midfielder for Le Havre. Born in France, he represents Republic of the Congo internationally.

Club career
Mbemba is a youth exponent from Lille OSC. During the 2014–15 season, he joined Royal Mouscron-Péruwelz on a loan deal. He made his top division debut on 15 August 2014 against Standard Liège in a 5–2 home win. On 21 November 2015, he made his debut with Lille's first team on an away draw against Troyes AC.

In May 2016 Mbemba moved to Portugal, signing for Vitória Guimarães.

Mbemba helped Stade de Reims win the 2017–18 Ligue 2, helping promote them to the Ligue 1 for the 2018–19 season.

International career
Mbemba was born in France and is of Republic of the Congo, and Democratic Republic of the Congo descent. He was called up to the DR Congo national under-20 football team for a friendly against France U20s in 2015.

He later switched his international allegiance to the Republic of the Congo. He made his debut for the Congo national football team on 2 September 2021 in a World Cup qualifier against Namibia, a 1–1 away draw. He started and played a full game.

Honours
Reims
 Ligue 2: 2017–18

References

External links

Living people
1995 births
Sportspeople from Amiens
Association football midfielders
Republic of the Congo footballers
Republic of the Congo international footballers
French footballers
Republic of the Congo people of Democratic Republic of the Congo descent
French sportspeople of Democratic Republic of the Congo descent
French sportspeople of Republic of the Congo descent
Black French sportspeople
Footballers from Hauts-de-France
Royal Excel Mouscron players
Vitória S.C. B players
Stade de Reims players
Le Havre AC players
Belgian Pro League players
Liga Portugal 2 players
Ligue 1 players
Ligue 2 players
French expatriate footballers
Republic of the Congo expatriate footballers
French expatriate sportspeople in Belgium
Expatriate footballers in Belgium
French expatriate sportspeople in Portugal
Expatriate footballers in Portugal
Republic of the Congo expatriate sportspeople in Belgium
Republic of the Congo expatriate sportspeople in Portugal